Shohola Township is a township in Pike County, Pennsylvania, United States. The population was 2,088 at the 2000 census.

Shohola is a Native American name meaning "place of peace."

Geography
According to the United States Census Bureau, the township has a total area of 45.9 square miles (118.8 km2), of which 44.6 square miles (115.6 km2)  is land and 1.2 square miles (3.2 km2)  (2.70%) is water.

Demographics

As of the census of 2000, there were 2,088 people, 836 households, and 585 families residing in the township. The population density was 46.8 people per square mile (18.1/km2). There were 3,089 housing units at an average density of 69.2/sq mi (26.7/km2). The racial makeup of the township was 97.99% White, 0.14% African American, 0.10% Native American, 0.34% Asian, 0.86% from other races, and 0.57% from two or more races. 3.64% of the population were Hispanic or Latino of any race.

There were 836 households, out of which 30.5% had children under the age of 18 living with them, 61.6% were married couples living together, 6.7% had a female householder with no husband present, and 30.0% were non-families. 26.2% of all households were made up of individuals, and 10.4% had someone living alone who was 65 years of age or older. The average household size was 2.47 and the average family size was 2.98.

In the township the population was spread out, with 24.4% under the age of 18, 4.3% from 18 to 24, 26.1% from 25 to 44, 27.9% from 45 to 64, and 17.3% who were 65 years of age or older. The median age was 42 years. For every 100 females there were 97.9 males. For every 100 females age 18 and over, there were 99.0 males.

The median income for a household in the township was $41,593, and the median income for a family was $46,207. Males had a median income of $38,080 versus $28,750 for females. The per capita income for the township was $20,840. 6.2% of the population and 4.2% of families were below the poverty line. Out of the total population, 8.5% of those under the age of 18 and 5.9% of those 65 and older were living below the poverty line.

Shohola Falls Recreation Area
Just off  U.S. Route 6 in Shohola, is Shohola Falls. The falls are a multi-tier level of falls flowing from Shohola Creek and continuing down the river.  An 8.2-mile loop hiking trail is provided for visitors.

Notable residents
Smoky Joe Wood, baseball pitcher.

See also
Barryville–Shohola Bridge
Shohola train wreck

References

External links

 Township website
 Shohola Area Historical Information

Populated places established in 1775
Townships in Pike County, Pennsylvania
Towns in the New York metropolitan area